The Young Offenders may refer to:

 The Young Offenders (film), a 2016 feature film directed by Peter Foott
 The Young Offenders (TV series), a 2018–20 television series based on the film, developed by Peter Foott